George Blakely (July 5, 1870 – November 16, 1965) was an army officer and an American Brigadier general active during World War I.

Early life 
Blakely was born in Pennsylvania. In 1892 he graduated number four of sixty-two from the United States Military Academy. His younger brother, Charles School Blakely, was also a graduate of the United States Military Academy and later a general.

Career 
Upon graduation, he was commissioned in the Second Artillery Brigade and graduated from the Artillery School in 1896. From 1898 to 1901, and again from 1903 to 1908, he was an assistant professor of mathematics at the United States Military Academy. He served in the Coast Artillery but was later detailed to the Inspector General's Department. On August 2, 1917, Blakely was promoted to brigadier general, commanding the 61st Field Artillery Brigade at Fort Worth, Texas. From September 18, 1917, until December 5 of the same year, he temporarily commanded the 36th Infantry Division.  From July to October 1918, he commanded the South Atlantic Coast Artillery District. From October 1918 to February 1919, Blakely was sent to France as commanding general of the 38th Artillery Brigade. After the war, he commanded the North Pacific Coast Artillery District.

Blakely retired in 1924 as a colonel.
His rank of brigadier general was restored by act of Congress in June 1930.

Death and legacy
George Blakely died at the age of ninety-five on November 16, 1965.

References

Bibliography 
Davis, Henry Blaine Jr. Generals in Khaki. Raleigh, NC: Pentland Press, 1998.  
Marquis Who's Who, Inc. Who Was Who in American History, the Military. Chicago: Marquis Who's Who, 1975.  

1870 births
1965 deaths
United States Army generals of World War I
United States Army generals
United States Military Academy alumni
Military personnel from Pennsylvania
United States Military Academy faculty